A community indifference curve is an illustration of different combinations of commodity quantities that would bring a whole community the same level of utility. The model can be used to describe any community, such as a town or an entire nation. In a community indifference curve, the indifference curves of all those individuals are aggregated and held at an equal and constant level of utility.

History 

Invented by Tibor Scitovsky, a Hungarian born economist, in 1941.

Solving for a CIC 

A community indifference curve (CIC) provides the set of all aggregate endowments  needed to achieve a given distribution of utilities, . The community indifference curve can be found by solving for the following minimization problem:
	
CICs assume allocative efficiency amongst members of the community. Allocative Efficiency provides that .

Community indifference curves are an aggregate of individual indifference curves.

See also
 Indifference curve

References 

Albouy, David. "Welfare Economics with a Full Production Economy." Economics 481. Fall 2007.

Deardorff's Glossary of International Economics.

Welfare economics